The Washington Stars were an American soccer team established in 1987 as F.C. Washington.  The team entered the American Soccer League in 1988 under the name Washington Stars and merged with the Maryland Bays in 1990.

History
Founded in the spring of 1987 as F.C. Washington, the team grew out of the Fairfax Spartans which won the 1986 National Amateur Cup.  The team, headed by president Gordon Bradley and located in Fairfax, Virginia, hired John Kerr, Sr. as head coach on June 24, 1987.  Coach Bradley was the coach of George Mason University (GMU) at that time. Two of their players, Kent Shiffert and Chris Myers were recruited from GMU.  The team played its first game on July 26, 1987 against the Canadian Pan American soccer team.  In March 1988, the team became a charter member of the third American Soccer League under the name Washington Stars.  The team joined the American Professional Soccer League in 1990 when the ASL merged with the Western Soccer League. After the 1990 season, the team merged into the Maryland Bays.  The team played at stadiums at Fairfax High School and W.T. Woodson High School in Fairfax, VA.

Bruce Murray, a member of the US National Team who earned 88 caps had a hand in both US goals at the 1990 World Cup (a goal against Austria and an assist against Czechoslovakia), played for the Stars in all three seasons.

Year-by-year

Coach
 John Kerr, Sr. (1987-1990)
 George Lidster (assistant) (1987-1990)

Mascot
The Washington Stars mascot was a human dressed in a black skin tight suit with silver moon boots, silver cape, and a large foam head in the shape of a star.  Historically, the Washington Stars hired local students from W.T. Woodson High School to serve as the mascot.  Michael Salih was the original and longest serving StarMan.

References

External links
 American Soccer League: 1988-1989
 American Professional Soccer League: 1990-1996

Defunct soccer clubs in Washington, D.C.
American Soccer League (1988–89) teams
American Professional Soccer League teams
1987 establishments in Washington, D.C.
1990 disestablishments in Washington, D.C.
Association football clubs established in 1987
Association football clubs disestablished in 1990